Susan Bode is a set decorator. She was nominated for an Academy Award in the category Best Art Direction for the film Bullets over Broadway.

Selected filmography
 Bullets over Broadway (1994)
 The Object of My Affection (1998)

References

External links

Year of birth missing (living people)
Living people
Set decorators